Ruslan Barylyak (born 28 March 1998) is a professional Ukrainian football defender.

Career
Barylyak is a product of the Hazovyk-Khurtovyna Komarno and FC Lviv Youth Sportive School systems.

He spent his career as a player for FC Oleksandriya in the Ukrainian Premier League Reserves and after for FC Lviv in the Ukrainian Second League.

References

External links
Statistics at FFU website (Ukr)

1998 births
Living people
Sportspeople from Lviv
Ukrainian footballers
FC Oleksandriya players
FC Lviv players
Association football defenders